Crematogaster abrupta is a species of ant in tribe Crematogastrini. It was described by William M. Mann in 1919.

References

abrupta
Insects described in 1919